Cottonwood Lake is a lake in Marshall County, South Dakota, in the United States.

The lake was so named on account of the cottonwood trees found at the lake.

See also
List of lakes in South Dakota

References

Lakes of South Dakota
Lakes of Marshall County, South Dakota